DSDA may refer to:
 Defence Storage and Distribution Agency, a previous executive agency of the Government of the United Kingdom under the Ministry of Defence (MoD).
 Dual SIM Dual Active, a dual SIM phone that can use two SIM cards at the same time.